Imogen Holly Aird (born 18 May 1969) is an English television actress known for playing forensic pathologist Frankie Wharton in the BBC1 drama series Waking the Dead, having previously starred in productions such as Soldier Soldier and the 1997 film Fever Pitch alongside Colin Firth.

Early life
Aird was born in Aldershot, Hampshire.  She was spotted by a casting director at age nine whilst at Bush Davies Ballet School and starred in the 1980 dramatisation of the H. G. Wells novel The History of Mr Polly. In 1981 she portrayed the young Elspeth Huxley in the television adaptation of the latter's autobiographical book The Flame Trees of Thika.

Career
In 1981 she portrayed Elspeth Huxley in The Flame Trees of Thika. In 1982 she starred as the young Beatrix Potter in The Tale of Beatrix Potter. She was seen in The Happy Valley in 1987 with Denholm Elliott, in which she played a schoolgirl in Kenya in the 1930s. As well as small parts in various television series, Aird became known for playing Nancy Thorpe/Garvey in Soldier Soldier. In 2000 she starred as Frankie Wharton in Waking the Dead. Aird has done voiceover for various BBC natural history projects (including Wild Mallorca) as well as various TV advertisements. In 2007 she played a clinical psychologist in Channel 4's drama 'Secret Life' and in 2009 took a leading role in Talkback Thames's Monday Monday.

Family
Aird has two children, Joseph (with James Purefoy) and Nelly (with husband Toby Merritt, who is a freelance photographer).

Filmography

Film

Television

References

External links
BBC Biography

1969 births
Living people
Actors  from Aldershot
English film actresses
English television actresses
Actresses from Hampshire
20th-century English actresses
21st-century English actresses